The men's long jump event at the 2007 Pan American Games was held on July 23–24.

Medalists

Results

Qualification
Qualifying perf. 7.80 (Q) or 12 best performers (q) advanced to the Final.

Final

References
Official results

Long
2007